Ken Goodland (3 August 1940 – 26 March 1982) was an Australian rules footballer who played with Geelong in the VFL during the early 1960s.

Football
Used mostly as a ruckman or half back, Goodland came off the bench in Geelong's 1963 premiership side. 

On 6 July 1963 he was a member of the Geelong team that were comprehensively and unexpectedly beaten by Fitzroy, 9.13 (67) to 3.13 (31) in the 1963 Miracle Match.

He had career riddled with injuries, including breaking his leg in the opening game of the 1964 season.

See also
 1963 Miracle Match

References

External links

1940 births
Australian rules footballers from Victoria (Australia)
Geelong Football Club players
Geelong Football Club Premiership players
1982 deaths
One-time VFL/AFL Premiership players